The Mexican War Midshipmen's Monument at the intersection of Stribling Walk and Chapel Walk, center campus of the US Naval Academy, is in memory of two passed midshipmen (H. A. Clemson, J. R. Hynson) who lost their lives when the brig  sank in 1846, one midshipman (J. W. Pillsbury) who drowned near 'Vera Cruz' in 1846, and another midshipman (T. B. Shubrick) who lost his life in the siege of Veracruz in 1847.

The monument is made of marble and measures . Often shortened to the Mexican Monument, it is also known as the Clemson Monument, and is by an unknown designer. It was an 1848 gift by the Academy's Brigade of Midshipmen.

Description
"A marble obelisk with a bronze wreath on each side is mounted on top of a square marble base adorned with four marble cannon tubes positioned vertically at each corner. Surrounding the base are four cannons, one pointed from each corner."
The surrounding horizontal cannons are Spanish 12-pounder smooth-bore bronze guns captured in 1847 by the US Navy from the Mexicans in California.

Inscriptions
One name is on each side of the obelisk: CLEMSON·SHUBRICK·PILLSBURY·HYNSON.  Each name is surmounted by a leaf wreath.

On the monument's base, below Clemson:

On the monument's base, below Pillsbury:

On the monument's base's sides below Hynson and Shubrick are stylized fouled anchors.

Notes

References

Monuments and memorials in Maryland
1848 sculptures
United States Naval Academy buildings and structures